The Lokottaravāda (Sanskrit, लोकोत्तरवाद) was one of the early Buddhist schools according to Mahayana doxological sources compiled by Bhāviveka, Vinitadeva and others, and was a subgroup which emerged from the Mahāsāṃghika.

Etymology
The name Lokottaravāda means those who follow the supramundane (Skt. lokottara), or transcendent, teachings. Despite bearing this name, all sub-sects of the Mahāsāṃghikas seem to have accepted forms of supramundane or transcendent teachings.

Early history
The Śāriputraparipṛcchā and the Samayabhedoparacanacakra both suggest that the Lokottaravāda had their origins with the Ekavyāvahārikas and the Kukkuṭikas. While the Mahāsāṃghikas initially flourished in the region around Magadha, the Lokottaravādins are known to have flourished in the Northwest.

According to this account, they split into three groups based upon the relative manner and degree to which they accepted the authority of these Mahayana texts. According to Paramārtha, the Lokottaravādins accepted the Mahāyāna sūtras as the words of the Buddha (buddhavacana).

Texts

Mahāvastu
Lokottaravādin views are known from the Mahāvastu, which is a rare surviving Mahāsāṃghika text in Sanskrit. The Mahāvastu is a biography of the Buddha which attributes itself to the Lokottaravādins, and appears to have been an extended section of their vinaya recension. The Sanskrit text of the Mahāvastu was preserved in the libraries of the Mahayana Buddhists of Nepal.

Sukhāvatīvyūha influences
Some scholars believe that the Mahayana Infinite Life Sutra was compiled in the era of the Kushan Empire, the first and second centuries CE, by an order of Mahīśāsaka monastics that flourished in Gandhara. However, it is likely that the longer Infinite Life Sutra owes greatly to the Lokottaravādins as well for its compilation: in this sūtra, there are many elements in common with the Mahāvastu. The earliest of these translations show traces of having been translated from the Gandhari Prakrit.

Bamiyan monastery collection
The Chinese Buddhist monk Xuanzang visited a Lokottaravāda vihara in the 7th century CE at Bamyan (modern Afghanistan); this monastery site has since been rediscovered by archaeologists. Birch bark and palm-leaf manuscripts of texts in this monastery's collection, including Mahayana sutras, have been discovered at the site, and these are now located in the Schøyen Collection. Some manuscripts are in  Gandhari Prakrit and written in Kharosthi, while others are in Sanskrit written in Gupta scripts. Manuscripts and fragments that have survived from this monastery's collection include the following source texts:

 Prātimokṣa Vibhaṅga of the Mahāsāṃghika-Lokottaravāda (MS 2382/269)
 Mahāparinirvāṇa Sūtra, a sūtra from the Āgamas (MS 2179/44)
 Caṃgī Sūtra, a sūtra from the Āgamas (MS 2376)
 Diamond Sutra, a Mahayana sutra (MS 2385)
 Bhaiṣajyaguru Sūtra, a Mahayana sutra (MS 2385)
 Śrīmālādevī Siṃhanāda Sūtra, a Mahayana sutra (MS 2378)
 Pravāraṇa Sūtra, a Mahayana sutra (MS 2378)
 Sarvadharmapravṛttinirdeśa Sūtra, a Mahayana sutra (MS 2378)
 Ajātaśatrukaukṛtyavinodana Sūtra, a Mahayana sutra (MS 2378)
 Śāriputrābhidharma Śāstra (MS 2375/08)

Doctrines

Overview
It is likely that the Lokottaravādins had no major doctrinal distinctions to distinguish them as different from Mahāsāṃghika, but that the difference was instead a geographic one. Tāranātha viewed the Ekavyāvahārikas, Lokottaravādins, and Gokulikas as being essentially the same. He even viewed Ekavyāvahārika as being a general term for the Mahāsaṃghikas. The earlier Samayabhedoparacanacakra of Vasumitra also regards the Ekavyāvahārikas, Gokulikas, and Lokottaravādins as being doctrinally indistinguishable.

Emptiness
The Lokottaravādins asserted that there are no real things in the world except two kinds of emptiness (Skt. śūnyatā), that is, the emptiness of a self (Skt. pudgalaśūnyatā) and the emptiness of phenomena (Skt. dharmaśūnyatā). This two-fold view of emptiness is also a distinguishing characteristic of Mahāyāna Buddhism.

Buddhas and bodhisattvas
According to Vasumitra, 48 theses were held in common by these three Mahāsāṃghika sects. Of the 48 special theses attributed by the Samayabhedoparacanacakra to these sects, 20 points concern the supramundane nature of buddhas and bodhisattvas. According to the Samayabhedoparacanacakra, these four groups held that the Buddha is able to know all dharmas in a single moment of the mind.

The Buddha is viewed as transcendent (Skt. lokottara) and his life and physical manifestation are mere appearance. The Lokottaravāda school upheld the Mahāsāṃghika view of the supramundane nature of the buddhas and bodhisattvas, and the imperfection and fallibility of arhats.

Bodhisattva Path
The Lokottaravādin Mahāvastu speaks of Buddhism as consisting of the Three Vehicles, and includes specific instructions regarding the Bodhisattva Path and the practices of bodhisattvas. From the Mahāvastu, we know that the Lokottaravādins had a conception of a bodhisattva's progress toward enlightenment as consisting of ten grounds, or bhūmis, as required for Mahayana bodhisattvas. These bhūmis described in the Mahāvastu are similar to those in the Mahāyāna Ten Stages Sutra, but the names of these stages seem to differ somewhat.

Buddha-fields
From the Mahāvastu, it is evident that the Lokottaravādins also held that there were innumerable pure lands (Skt.  "buddha-fields"), throughout which there are innumerable buddhas and innumerable tenth-ground bodhisattvas who will become buddhas. Each is said to lead limitless sentient beings to liberation, yet the number of sentient beings remains essentially infinite.

Equality of buddhas
In the Mahāvastu, there are some Lokottaravādin accounts of the nature of buddhas which have strong parallels to those in Mahayana sutras. In one section, a multitude of devas are described as putting up sunshades in honor of the Buddha, who in turn shows himself sitting beneath each and every one. Each deva believes himself to be particularly honored, unaware of the fictitious character of his own buddha, who is no different from the others he sees. This has a parallel with an account in the Śūraṅgama Samādhi Sūtra. In this text, the Buddha appears simultaneously on a vast number of lion-thrones prepared by various devas, but each deva sees only the buddha that is sitting on his own throne. At the appropriate moment, all the buddhas are revealed to the devas, and one asks which is real – his own buddha, or all the others. In the Śūraṅgama Samādhi Sūtra, the Buddha's answer is ultimately that they are all equal, because the nature of buddhas is not apart from all phenomena.

Future buddhas
In the Mahāvastu, the future buddha Maitreya is mentioned a number of times, and the text states that he will be just one of the one thousand buddhas who are destined to appear in the future following Gautama Buddha. The Mahāsāṃghika-Lokottaravāda view is contrasted with that of the Theravada, which holds that five buddhas are destined to follow Gautama.

See also
 Buddhism in Afghanistan

References

Bibliography

External links
 J. J. Jones (1949). The Mahavastu (English translation), including footnotes and glossary

Nikaya schools
Mahāsāṃghika
Medieval Afghanistan
Early Buddhist schools